This is a list of television programs broadcast by the American television network The Weather Channel.

There are four main types of programs on The Weather Channel: weather news programs, serial documentaries, Long-form shows, and specials such as the 100 Biggest Weather Moments, Top 100 Weather Moments, and Coast Guard: HMS Bounty.

Programs

Current programs

News
All current news programs broadcast in high definition.

Long-form
 

Note 1: Episodes premiering from 2009 on air in high definition. Episodes from earlier years are in standard definition

Former programs
''

Lists of television series by network